Yonatan is an Israeli settlement and moshav located in the central Golan Heights. Initially a moshav shitufi, it underwent a privatization process to become a community settlement. The settlement is affiliated with the Hapoel HaMizrachi movement, and is under the jurisdiction of Golan Regional Council.

The international community considers Israeli settlements in the Golan Heights illegal under international law, but the Israeli government disputes this.

Etymology
The settlement is named after Yonatan Rosenman, who was killed while operating a tank during the Yom Kippur War.

History
The settlement was founded, together with four other settlements, during Yitzhak Rabin's first term as Prime Minister. The original founding nucleus included people from Yonatan Rosenman's Nahal gar'in.  Immediately after the Yom Kippur War the founders including Yonatan's brother, Didi, decided to name a settlement after him and to start an agricultural community in the Golan Heights. In 1975 the settlement was started temporarily in the area of the settlement kibbutz Merom Golan, and about a year later it moved to Tel Farj.  Only in 1978 did it move to its present-day location.

Landmine incident
In May 2013, a mine exploded during a mine-clearing exercise close to Moshav Yonatan.  The explosion killed a newly recruited IDF soldier in the Engineering Corps.

Geography
It is about a 12-minute drive to Katsrin, 20 minutes to the Kinneret, half an hour from Hatzor, 45 minute drive to the holy cities of Tiberias and Tsfat, and about 50 minutes from Carmiel.

Population
Residents of the settlement are members of Bnei Akiva. About 350 people live there, including 75 families and 210 children as of 2007. There is a significant English speaking population on the Moshav as well.

Community
Community life on the moshav is very active, with emphasis on Jewish Orthodox and Zionist life style. A wide range of professionals live on Yonatan. There is a pediatrician, a dentist, a general practitioner, a university lecturer, a landscape architect, rabbinical scholars, teachers, electricians, high tech people, a plumber, and a policeman. For children there are Talmud Torah classes and gymboree. For adults: various shiurim given both by the Rabbi and other members of the community, and the culture committee organizes parties, holiday activities, and women's evenings. There is a grocery store, a health clinic, a secretarial office which provides postal services, a mikva, a library, and a gas station on the moshav.

Economy
The economy is based on apple and plum orchards and viniculture. Yonatan also has mango, pears, and passiflora orchards in the Beit Tzida Valley and field crops include cotton, corn, wheat, and tomatoes for industry.   The community has areas for pasture, chicken coops which markets 600,000 chickens a year, and the second-largest dairy herd in Israel (as of 2007), whose milk is delivered to Tnuva, a vineyard which supplies grapes to the Golan Heights winery. Yonatan also partners with the resort village Kinar on the shore of the Sea of Galilee.

See also
Israeli-occupied territories

References

External links
Official website 

Israeli settlements in the Golan Heights
Golan Regional Council
Moshavim
Populated places in Northern District (Israel)
Populated places established in 1975
1975 establishments in the Israeli Military Governorate